is one of the eleven wards in the city of Kyoto, in Kyoto Prefecture, Japan. Located in the center of the present-day city of Kyoto, Japan it previously occupied the northern region of the ancient capital of Kyoto. The Kamo River flows on the eastern border of the ward. The area was previously a district of residences for the royalty and upper classes in the old capital.

As of 2020,  had a population of 83,832 people.

The Masugata Shōtengai Shopping District, is the setting of the 2013 anime series, Tamako Market, produced by Kyoto Animation.

Demographics

Education

 Doshisha University
 Kyoto Prefectural University of Medicine
 Heian Jogakuin University
 Imadegawa Campus of Doshisha Women's College of Liberal Arts

The Lycée Français de Kyoto, the French international school in Kansai, was in this ward.

Kyoto International School is also in this ward.

References

External links

  
Kamigyo Ward mascot character, Kamigyukun 

Wards of Kyoto